Antoinette Beumer (born Janssen; 1962) is a Dutch film director. She is notable for having directed the 2010 films The Happy Housewife and Loft.

Biography

Beumer was born as Antoinette Janssen in Nieuwer-Amstel, North Holland, the Netherlands. She is the sister of actresses Marjolein Beumer and Famke Janssen.

Filmography

Director 
 Rendez-Vous (2015)
 Soof (2013)
 Jackie (2012)
 Loft (2010)
 The Happy Housewife (2010)
 See You in Vegas (2007)

References

External links

1962 births
Living people
Dutch women film directors
People from Amstelveen